Vetrenjače is the third studio album published by Serbian musician and producer Gru. The album was certified gold in Serbia, and it won him the Serbian Oscar of Popularity for Best Concert in 1999. It also featured the chart-topping song Adrenaline Junkie, featured in the soundtrack for the American film Undisputed II: Last Man Standing.

Vetrenjače features production by Andonov and musician Marko Kon, on behalf of the label City Records, and later Komuna.

Track listing

See also
Music of Serbia
Serbian hip hop

References

Gru (rapper) albums
1999 albums
Hardcore hip hop albums